This is the discography of The Hellacopters, a Swedish rock band active between 1994 and 2008. The band was formed by Nicke Andersson (vocals and guitar), Dregen (guitar), Robban Eriksson (drums) and Kenny Håkansson (bass guitar). The band released their Swedish Grammis-winning debut album in 1996. Soon the band recruited The Diamond Dogs guitarist Anders Lindström to play keyboard shortly before being the opening act to Kiss With the success of the band's second album Andersson was able to leave his other band Entombed to focus full-time on The Hellacopters. During the tour in support of the album, guitarist Dregen chose to leave the band to focus his time on his other band The Backyard Babies; to fulfill their touring responsibilities the band recruited Danne Andersson and Mattias Hellberg to fill in during the remaining dates of the tour. With Hellberg and Lindström taking the place of Dregen during the recording of the band's third album, the band changed their sound from their dirtier garage rock and garage punk sound to a more classic 1970s rock sound. The band then hired Robert Dahlqvist as a full-time guitarist, solidifying the band's lineup until its breakup. With Dahlqvist on board the band released three more studio albums and a cover album, with many EPs and limited edition releases as well. The Hellacopters disbanded amicably in 2008 so the members could move on to other projects.

Studio albums

Compilation albums

Split albums

Split singles

Extended plays

Singles

Music videos
 "(Gotta Get Some Action) Now!"  (1996)
 "Soulseller" (1997)
 "The Devil Stole The Beat From The Lord" (1999)
 "Toys And Flavours" (2000)
 "Hopeless Case Of A Kid In Denial" (2000)
 "No Song Unheard"  (2001)
 "Carry Me Home" (2002)
 "By The Grace Of God" (2002)
 "Everything's on T.V." (2005)
 "I'm In The Band" (2005)
 "Bring it on home" (2006)
 "The Same Lame Story" (2007)
 "In The Sign of the Octopus" (2008)
 "Darling Darling" (2008)

Other appearances

DVDs

References

External links

Rock music group discographies
Discographies of Swedish artists